Lyutvi Ahmed Mestan (born 24 December 1960) is a Bulgarian politician of Turkish-Bulgarian origin. He was chairman of the Movement for Rights and Freedoms from January 2013 to 24 December 2015. He has been the Member of Parliament for Kardzhali. He was removed as party leader by the DPS central council and expelled from the party for what it considered an excessively pro-Turkish government stance following the downing of a Russian bomber jet by the Turkish Air Force. He subsequently founded a new political force, DOST, acronym of Democrats for Responsibility, Solidarity and Tolerance in Bulgarian, and a double entendre also signifying friend in Turkish. The party is based on pro-EU, pro-NATO and liberal opinions.

References

External Links 

1960 births
Living people
People from Kardzhali Province
Members of the National Assembly (Bulgaria)
Bulgarian Muslims
Bulgarian people of Turkish descent
Movement for Rights and Freedoms politicians